Heinrich Andreas Contius, also Cuntius (1708 – 1795 in Valmiera, Livonia) is considered the most important organ builder in the Baltic States in the 18th century.

Life 
Contius was born in 1708 as the son of the organ builder Christoph Cuntzius in Halle an der Saale, Duchy of Magdeburg. In 1732 he is recorded as a journeyman of Joachim Wagner. He initially had his own workshop in Altenburg. From 1736/37, Contius worked in Halle and the surrounding area. Den Auftrag erhielt er aber nicht.

In 1760, Contius moved to Riga in Courland, where he built an organ for the St. James's Cathedral, Riga. He then worked in Tallinn in Estonia and became the leading organ builder there. In 1771, he returned to Riga and in 1773 was commissioned to build a new building in the great Holy Trinity Cathedral, Liepāja (Libau), which was completed in 1779. In Valmiera, Contius opened a workshop together with Johann Andreas Stein (1752-1821) from Augsburg, who subsequently built further organs in Courland (1787 Cēsis, St. Johannis, 1788 Evele Wohlfahrtskirche).

Works (selection) 
Contius is known to have built several new organs, as well as repairs and a maintenance contract in the Duchy of Magdeburg, Courland and Estonia. Preserved are most of the Holy Trinity Cathedral, Liepāja, as well as the casing in the St. James's Cathedral in Riga. A replica of the organ in Liepāja has been under construction since 2016 in Leuven, Belgium.

References

Further reading 
 Alexander Fiseisky: Die Geschichte der Orgel und der Orgelmusik in Estland. In , 29, 2006, 11–32.
 Alexander Fiselsky: Die Geschichte der Orgel in Lettland. In Acta Organologica, 28, 2004. . Zusammenfassung 
 
 

German pipe organ builders
1708 births
1795 deaths
People from Halle (Saale)
Baltic-German people